The native form of this personal name is Kálnoky László. This article uses the Western name order.

László Kálnoky (Eger, September 5, 1912 – Budapest, July 30, 1985) was a Hungarian poet and literary translator.

He belonged to the third generation of Nyugat. His poetry was highly typical of pessimism.

Biography

Poetry

Books of poetry 

 Az árnyak kertje [The Garden of the Shadows] (1939)
 Lázas csillagon [In a Feverish Star] (1957)
 Lángok árnyékában [In the Shadow of the Flames] (1970)
 Letépett álarcok [Tearing Off the Masks] (1972)
 Farsang utóján [At the End of the Carnival] (1977)
 A szemtanú [The Eyewitness] (1979)
 Összegyűjtött versek [Collected Poems] (1980, 1992, 2006) 
 Egy hiéna utóélete és más történetek [The Posterity of a Hyena and Other Stories] (1981)
 Az üvegkalap [The Glass Hat] (1982)
 Bálnák a parton [Whales on the Shore] (1983)
 A gyógyulás hegyén [At the Mountain of Recovery] (1983)
 Egy mítosz születése [The Birth of a Myth] (1985)
 Hőstettek az ülőkádban (1986)
 Egy pontosvessző térdkalácsa (1996)

References

Sources 
:hu:Kálnoky László

1912 births
1985 deaths
Hungarian male poets
20th-century Hungarian poets
20th-century Hungarian male writers